The Champions Cup was a professional non-ranking snooker tournament held in England that ran for eight seasons starting in the 1994/1995 season and was originally known as the Charity Challenge. The last champion was John Higgins.

History
The tournament was originally called the Charity Challenge. The event was unique by having the players compete for charity, with the prize money being donated to their respective causes. The event started in the 1994/1995 season and was contested by a 16-man field, but was reduced to an 8-man field by the 1996/1997 season. The event is most notable for Stephen Hendry compiling a maximum break in the deciding frame of the 1997 final against Ronnie O'Sullivan. It is the only time that a maximum break has been made in the deciding frame of a final in professional competition.

After five seasons the charity aspect was dropped and replaced with a new format. The event was re-branded the Champions Cup and was contested by the players, who won major tournaments in the previous season. In its inaugural year it adopted a “winner takes all” format with a £175,000 prize going to the winner, with the other contestants receiving nothing. The winner's prize was the second highest after the World Championship. In subsequent years the event had a more conventional prize money schedule.

The tournament was sponsored by Liverpool Victoria for all but the last two events. In 2000 the event was sponsored by TVN and there was no sponsor in 2001. The event was broadcast on ITV, but was dropped from the calendar after the 2001 event due to ITV discontinuing its snooker coverage.

Winners

See also
 Champion of Champions (snooker)

References

 
Snooker non-ranking competitions
Recurring sporting events established in 1995
Recurring sporting events disestablished in 2001
1995 establishments in England
2001 disestablishments in England
Snooker competitions in England
Defunct snooker competitions
Defunct sports competitions in England